The 2006–07 season are the Esteghlal Football Club's 6th season in the Iran Pro League, and their 13th consecutive season in the top division of Iranian football. They are also competing in the Hazfi Cup and 62nd year in existence as a football club.

Player
As of 1 September 2013. Esteghlal F.C. Iran Pro League Squad 2006–07

Transfers 
Confirmed transfers 2006–07

In:

Out:

Competitions

Overall

Iran Pro League

Standings

Results summary

Results by round

Matches

Hazfi Cup

AFC Champions League

Group stage

Group D 
Esteghlal Tehran was disqualified from Group B for failing to register their players list in time.

See also
 2006–07 Iran Pro League
 2006–07 Hazfi Cup

References

External links
Iran Premier League Statistics
Persian League

2006-07
Iranian football clubs 2006–07 season